The Florida Complex League Rays are a minor league baseball team in Port Charlotte, Florida, competing as a Rookie-level team in the Florida Complex League as an affiliate of the Tampa Bay Rays. Prior to 2021, the team was known as the Gulf Coast League Rays. The team plays most of their home games on field no. five of the Charlotte Sports Park complex, and also play select games in the main stadium.

The team first played from 1996 to 1998 as the Gulf Coast League Devil Rays. The club struggled during their first two years, but made it to the league championship in 1998, before losing to the GCL Rangers. The team was not fielded after the 1998 season until returning to the Gulf Coast League in 2009. Prior to the 2021 season, the league was renamed as the Florida Complex League.

Season-by-season

Roster

Notes

References

External links
 Official website

Florida Complex League teams
Baseball teams established in 1996
Professional baseball teams in Florida
Gul
Gul
1996 establishments in Florida